In mathematics, Minkowski's first inequality for convex bodies is a geometrical result due to the German mathematician Hermann Minkowski. The inequality is closely related to the Brunn–Minkowski inequality and the isoperimetric inequality.

Statement of the inequality

Let K and L be two n-dimensional convex bodies in n-dimensional Euclidean space Rn. Define a quantity V1(K, L) by

where V denotes the n-dimensional Lebesgue measure and + denotes the Minkowski sum. Then

with equality if and only if K and L are homothetic, i.e. are equal up to translation and dilation.

Remarks

 V1 is just one example of a class of quantities known as mixed volumes.
 If L is the n-dimensional unit ball B, then n V1(K, B) is the (n − 1)-dimensional surface measure of K, denoted S(K).

Connection to other inequalities

The Brunn–Minkowski inequality

One can show that the Brunn–Minkowski inequality for convex bodies in Rn implies Minkowski's first inequality for convex bodies in Rn, and that equality in the Brunn–Minkowski inequality implies equality in Minkowski's first inequality.

The isoperimetric inequality

By taking L = B, the n-dimensional unit ball, in Minkowski's first inequality for convex bodies, one obtains the isoperimetric inequality for convex bodies in Rn: if K is a convex body in Rn, then

with equality if and only if K is a ball of some radius.

References

 

Calculus of variations
Geometric inequalities
Normed spaces